James Bagwell is an American conductor and professor at Bard College, where he is also director of the Music Program and codirector of the graduate program in conducting at the Bard College Conservatory of Music. He is principal guest conductor of the American Symphony Orchestra and was music director of the Collegiate Chorale from 2009 to 2015.

References 

Year of birth missing (living people)
Place of birth missing (living people)
Living people
Bard College faculty
American choral conductors
American male conductors (music)
21st-century American conductors (music)
21st-century American male musicians